Anatol Arapu (born 27 November 1962) is a Moldovan economist, who served as Minister of Finances of Moldova from 14 August 2013 to January 2016, in three consecutive cabinets: Leancă Cabinet, Gaburici Cabinet, and Streleț Cabinet. He also was Minister of Finances in the 1990s, in Ciubuc-2 Cabinet (22 May 1998 - 17 February 1999) and in Sturza Cabinet (12 March - 12 November 1999).

Biography
Anatol Arapu was born on 27 November 1962 in the village of Văsieni, Ialoveni. He graduated from the Faculty of Economics of the State University of Moldova in 1985, the Economic and Statistical Institute of Moscow in 1987 and the Institute of the World Trade Organization in Geneva, Switzerland in 1993. In the period 1988-1992 he was director of the "Moldova - EXIM" trust. During 1994-1997 he worked as an assistant to the World Bank executive direction, and from 1997 to 1998 he was Ambassador of the Republic of Moldova to the European Union, NATO, Belgium, the Netherlands, and Luxembourg.

He subsequently worked for Lukoil România as a financial director for one year, and from 2001 to 2013 he served as Deputy General Manager for Economic and Financial Affairs. From 14 August 2013 he is the Minister of Finance of the Republic of Moldova initially in the Leancă Cabinet, then in the Gaburici Cabinet and the Streleț Cabinet. Although he is not a party member, he has become Minister as being submitted by the Liberal Democratic Party of Moldova.

He is married and has a child. He speaks Romanian (native), Russian (fluent), English (fluent) and French (medium).

References

External links

 Anatol Arapu on gov.md (CV) 
Cine este noul ministru al Finanțelor, Anatol Arapu?

1962 births
Living people
21st-century Moldovan economists
Ambassadors of Moldova to Belgium
People from Ialoveni District
Moldovan Ministers of Finance
Ambassadors of Moldova to Luxembourg
Ambassadors of Moldova to the Netherlands
Ambassadors of Moldova to the European Union
20th-century Moldovan economists